The 2013 Zuiderduin Masters was a BDO/WDF darts tournament that took place in Egmond aan Zee, Netherlands.

Stephen Bunting won the tournament for the first time beating Alan Norris in the final.

Qualifying
The players in bold are the seeded players for the group stages. The players in italics qualified through more than one method.

Men

Women

Results

Men's tournament

Group stage
All matches best of 9 legs. Two points are gained for every match won.
P = Played; W = Won; L = Lost; LF = Legs for; LA = Legs against; +/− = Leg difference; Pts = Points

Group A

Dennie Bos 5–1 Jimmy Hendriks

Alan Norris (1) 5–1 Jimmy Hendriks

Alan Norris (1) 5–0 Dennie Bos

Group B

James Wilson 5–3 Rick Hofstra

Rick Hofstra 5–2 Benito van de Pas (8)

Benito van de Pas (8) 5–1 James Wilson

Group C

Jeffrey de Graaf 5–1 Richie George

Richie George 5–4 Jan Dekker (5)

Jeffrey de Graaf 5–1 Jan Dekker (5)

Group D

Ross Montgomery 5–3 John Walton

Steve Douglas (4) 5–3 John Walton

Ross Montgomery 5–4 Steve Douglas (4)

Group E

Robbie Green 5–3 Darryl Fitton

Tony O'Shea (3) 5–0 Darryl Fitton

Tony O'Shea (3) 5–3 Robbie Green

Group F

Bryan de Hoog 5–0 Michel van der Horst

Michel van der Horst 5–3 Scott Mitchell (6)

Scott Mitchell (6) 5–1 Bryan de Hoog

Group G

Remco van Eijden 5–2 Christian Kist

Wesley Harms (7) 5–3 Christian Kist

Remco van Eijden 5–4 Wesley Harms (7)

Group H

Geert De Vos 5–3 Martin Adams

Stephen Bunting (2) 5–3 Martin Adams

Stephen Bunting (2) 5–2 Geert De Vos

Knockout stages

Women's tournament

Group stage
All matches best of 7 legs. Two points are gained for every match won.
P = Played; W = Won; L = Lost; LF = Legs for; LA = Legs against; +/− = Leg difference; Pts = Points

Group A

Aileen de Graaf 4–0 Lorraine Farlam

Lorraine Farlam 4–1 Irina Armstrong (1)

Aileen de Graaf 4–1 Irina Armstrong (1)

Group B

Anastasia Dobromyslova 4–1 Sharon Prins

Sharon Prins 4–2 Deta Hedman (2)

Anastasia Dobromyslova 4–1 Deta Hedman (2)

Final
Best of 3 sets.

 Aileen de Graaf (84.69) 1–2  Anastasia Dobromyslova (74.34)

References

Finder Darts Masters
Zuiderduin Masters
2012 in Dutch sport